Mesontoplatys rufolaterus, is a species of dung beetle found from Indian subcontinent, throughout Sri Lanka, India, Pakistan, and many African countries such as Cameroon, Chad, Ethiopia, Ivory Coast, Madagascar, Senegal, Sudan, Republic Democratic of Congo, and the Republic of Guinea.

References 

Scarabaeidae
Insects of Sri Lanka
Insects of India
Insects of Pakistan
Insects described in 1863